The Myasishchev M-50 (NATO reporting name Bounder) is a Soviet prototype four-jet engine supersonic strategic bomber which never attained service. Only one flightworthy prototype was built, which was first flown in October 1959. The M-50 was constructed by the Myasishchev design bureau.

Design and development

The M-50 was a fast jet bomber with four engines: two Dobrynin VD-7 non-afterburning turbojet engines at the outer and two VD-7F afterburning turbojet engines at the inner positions. The two inner engines were located under the wing, and the two outer on the wingtips of its shoulder-mounted, truncated delta wings.

The second aircraft was designated M-52 and carried Zubets 16-17 turbofans, around which the aircraft had been designed. The engine installation was modified, and a second tailplane added to the top of the fin. The fore-end of the M-52 has been redesigned: in place of the tandem cockpit of the M-50 with seats in a row, the M-52 had a wider cockpit with the two pilots sitting side by side. The M-50 participated in a Soviet Aviation Day flyby in 1961. The M-52 was completed but was not flight-tested.

An unmanned M-51  intercontinental cruise missile variant was developed, would have delivered multiple warheads on targets in the contiguous United States.

Like most of the early 1960s supersonic strategic bomber projects, the M-50/52 program was terminated due to the development of the intercontinental ballistic missiles and the priority assigned to the Soviet space program.

Nuclear-powered bomber hoax
The 1 December 1958 issue of Aviation Week included an article Soviets Flight Testing Nuclear Bomber claiming that the Soviets had made great progress in their own nuclear aircraft program. This was accompanied by an editorial on the topic as well. The magazine claimed that the aircraft was real beyond a doubt, stating that "A nuclear-powered bomber is being flight tested in the Soviet Union. ... It has been observed both in flight and on the ground by a wide variety of foreign observers from Communist and non-Communist countries." In reality, however, the article was based on a hoax. The aircraft in the photographs was later revealed to be a M-50 and not a nuclear-powered plane at all.

In reality, in the early 1960s Soviet Union did test a technology demonstrator for a nuclear-powered strategic bomber, Tupolev Tu-95LAL, similar to the somewhat earlier American Convair NB-36H project, but, being based on the turboprop Tu-95, it was never supersonic, it never flew under nuclear power (its main goal was to test the nuclear reactor shielding efficiency), and, moreover, it was developed by the Tupolev Design Bureau, as Myasischev company had lost the competition to develop the prototype. It was deemed successful, but further development dragged because of environmental concerns. When the functional ICBMs appeared, the majority of funding and development effort was shifted into that field, and in the early 1960s the project was stopped. On 9 July 1961, the M-50A made its 19th and last flight, participating at a flypast over the annual Tushino air show. This was the one and only public appearance of the giant, currently displayed at the Monino Museum outside Moscow.

Specifications (M-50A)

See also

References

Bibliography

External links

 https://web.archive.org/web/20051029071603/http://www.aviation.ru/Mya/#50
 Another story, in English

Myasishchev aircraft
1950s Soviet bomber aircraft
Abandoned military aircraft projects of the Soviet Union
Quadjets
Aircraft first flown in 1959